Cathy Josefowitz (1956-28 June 2014) was an international artist with US and Swiss citizenship. She was born in New York City and moved with her parents at an early age to Switzerland. Later in her life she worked and lived in Paris, Boston, Amsterdam and Italy. She died in Geneva. Her work included paintings  and drawings in conversation with choreography.

Her extensive work is increasingly exhibited in the context of current discourses on figuration, gender, the body, otherness and identity.

Exhibitions 
 2022: The Thinking Body, Museum of Contemporary Art of Rome, Rome
 2021/22: The Thinking Body, Centre Culturel Suisse, Paris
 2021: The Thinking Body, Kunsthaus Langenthal, Langenthal
 2021: Empty rooms full of love, FRAC Champagne-Ardenne, Reims
 2007: Espace Hippomène, Genf
 2003: Galerie Nicolas Deman, Paris
 1994: Palazzo Pinucci, Galleria Via Larga, Florence

Publications 
 Cathy Josefowitz, Monograph, Textes from Ludovic Delalande, Rebecca Lamarche-Vadel, Elise Lammer, Mousse Publishing, 2019, 
Cathy Josefowitz. Dance Eat Love, Monograph, Text by Rebecca Lamarche-Vadel, Editions Dilecta, 2018, ISBN 9782373720747

Films 
 Painting dancing: Cathy Josefowitz, a film by François Lévy Kuentz, Fotografien von Mara De Wit, Pierre Yves Dhinaut, 52min, 2011
 Cathy Josefowitz, a film by François Lévy Kuentz, 31min, 2004

Sources

External links 
 www.cathyjosefowitz.ch
 Cathy Josefowitz in the catalogs of the DNB
 Cathy Josefowitz in SIKART

1956 births
2014 deaths
20th-century American women artists
20th-century Swiss women artists
21st-century American women artists
21st-century Swiss women artists
Artists from New York City
Swiss people of American descent